Tulotoma magnifica, common name the Alabama live-bearing snail or  tulotoma, is a species of large freshwater snail, an aquatic gastropod mollusk in the family Viviparidae.

Tulotoma is a monotypic genus, in other words, this is the only species in the genus.

This species was once widespread in the Coosa River-Alabama River system in Alabama, USA. It is now an endangered species.

Distribution
This species is endemic to the state of Alabama, United States.

Description 
The shell of this species is large, solid, thick and imperforate. The shape of the shell is obtusely conic. The spire is elevated. The whorls are flattened, nodulous and carinated. The peristome is thin and continuous.

The shell can grow fairly large, to more than 25 mm in height. 

The operculum is concentric, subtriangular, with the inner margin reflected and forming an elevated marginal fold.

Animal with a moderate foot, not produced beyond the snout. The snout is small. Radula is multicuspid.

References
This article incorporates public domain text from the reference

External links 

 Tulotoma magnifica at U.S. Fish & Wildlife Service webpage
 Raines B. (25 July 2011). "A good news snail story: This Alabama snail's recovering from brink of extinction". blog.al.com
 Paper on the rediscovery of this species

Viviparidae
Taxa named by Samuel Stehman Haldeman
Taxonomy articles created by Polbot